"Maybe Your Baby's Got the Blues" is a song written by Troy Seals and Graham Lyle, and recorded by American country music duo The Judds.  It was released in August 1987 as the third single from the album Heartland.  The song was their tenth number one on the country chart.

Charts
"Maybe Your Baby's Got the Blues" debuted on the U.S. Billboard Hot Country Singles & Tracks for the week of August 22, 1987.

Weekly charts

Year-end charts

References

1987 singles
The Judds songs
Songs written by Graham Lyle
Songs written by Troy Seals
RCA Records singles
Curb Records singles
Song recordings produced by Brent Maher
1987 songs